Babble.NET Group plc was a British internet telephony service. It was one of the first commercialisations of VoIP technology, appearing in 2004 approximately six months after the proprietary Skype opened up interest in telephony over the internet. Operating out of offices in London Docklands, west London and Hertfordshire, Babble was a SIP-based service with interconnections to the ordinary telephone network permitting inbound and outbound calls from its network.

Babble was re-launched in 2006 by Allan Howes and Simon Lewis who bought out the service from its parent and floated on the London Stock Exchange (Ofex: BABO). Babble.net was dissolved in 2010.

References

External links
 Babble.net - The internet telephony service - Babble.net (archived)

Telecommunications companies of the United Kingdom
VoIP services
British companies established in 2004
British companies disestablished in 2010